McGregor is a city in Clayton County, Iowa, United States. The population was 742 at the time of the 2020 census. McGregor is located on the Mississippi River across from Prairie du Chien, Wisconsin. Pike's Peak State Park is located just south of the city. Just to the north of McGregor is the city of Marquette. The community of McGregor Heights lies in the southern parts of the city limits.

History
McGregor was founded as MacGregor's Landing in 1847 by Alexandar MacGregor, a descendant of Rob Roy MacGregor, and the area around MacGregor's Landing was settled by the extended family. In 1849 it was reported that the original MacGregor seal and signet were owned by Alex MacGregor. The Scots Gaelic clan seal was inscribed, "S' Riogal Mo Dhream/ Een dhn bait spair nocht", which was interpreted as "Royalty is my race / End do and spare not". The signet was a bloodstone from Loch Lomond, and was sketched by William Williams.

Since 1837, MacGregor had been operating a ferry across the Mississippi River between Prairie du Chien, Wisconsin and the present site of McGregor, Iowa. MacGregor planned the new city as a six block development, and it was quickly populated, being incorporated as McGregor in 1857. In that same year, the Milwaukee & Mississippi Railroad finished building a railroad track from Milwaukee, Wisconsin to Prairie du Chien, Wisconsin, thus connecting Lake Michigan with the Mississippi River by rail. McGregor quickly became a major commercial center, and served as a hub where grain from Iowa and Minnesota could be transported across the Mississippi and sent on to Milwaukee via railroad. For example, around 1860, Joseph "Diamond Jo" Reynolds moved to McGregor in order to establish a grain trading business, and later ran his own steam packets. The Diamond Jo office building still stands in the city. More railroads were built to connect McGregor with cities further west, and the city of North McGregor (now Marquette, Iowa) was established just north of the city to serve as the city's railroad terminus. After reaching McGregor from the west, trains were disassembled and railroad cars were ferried across the Mississippi to continue on towards Lake Michigan.

The towns early residents made use of the bedrock to carve cellars into the soft sandstone, used for cold storage and ageing beer; as of 1997 most of the entryways are visible but inaccessible.

In 1874, the system of ferrying railroad cars across the river between North McGregor and Prairie du Chien, Wisconsin, was brought to an end when Prairie du Chien businessman John Lawler commissioned the construction of a permanent pontoon bridge to connect the two cities' rail lines. As the need for men to disassemble and ship trains across the river disappeared, the city's population began to decline. 

The city's history is preserved in the McGregor Commercial Historic District, which contains many buildings constructed during the city's boom years. Because of its colorful history and location beside the Mississippi River, the city has become a popular summer tourist destination, and it is known for its many antique stores.

The city was heavily damaged during a storm on July 19, 2017, with the downtown area being particularly hard hit.

Geography
McGregor is located at  (43.021903, -91.179811).
Mc Gregor lies at the valley floor of nearly vertical sandstone bluffs; the St. Peter Sandstone and Jordan Formation.

Demographics

2010 census
As of the census of 2010, there were 871 people, 410 households, and 225 families living in the city. The racial makeup of the city was 96.9% White, 0.1% African American, 0.3% Native American, 0.5% Asian, 0.2% Pacific Islander, and 2.0% from two or more races. Hispanic or Latino of any race were 1.7% of the population.

There were 410 households, of which 20.0% had children under the age of 18 living with them, 39.8% were married couples living together, 11.7% had a female householder with no husband present, 3.4% had a male householder with no wife present, and 45.1% were non-families. 39.0% of all households were made up of individuals, and 16.4% had someone living alone who was 65 years of age or older. The average household size was 2.02 and the average family size was 2.66.

The median age in the city was 48.3 years. 17.8% of residents were under the age of 18; 8.2% were between the ages of 18 and 24; 20% were from 25 to 44; 30.3% were from 45 to 64; and 23.8% were 65 years of age or older. The gender makeup of the city was 48.0% male and 52.0% female.

2000 census
As of the census of 2000, there were 871 people, 382 households, and 205 families living in the city. The racial makeup of the city was 99.54% White, 0.23% Native American, 0.11% Asian, and 0.11% from two or more races. Hispanic or Latino of any race were 0.69% of the population.

There were 382 households, out of which 23.3% had children under the age of 18 living with them, 40.1% were married couples living together, 10.2% had a female householder with no husband present, and 46.1% were non-families. 38.7% of all households were made up of individuals, and 16.5% had someone living alone who was 65 years of age or older. The average household size was 2.12 and the average family size was 2.83.

Age spread: 19.1% under the age of 18, 7.5% from 18 to 24, 24.3% from 25 to 44, 24.0% from 45 to 64, and 25.1% who were 65 years of age or older. The median age was 44 years. For every 100 females, there were 91.9 males. For every 100 females age 18 and over, there were 87.0 males.

The median income for a household in the city was $30,163, and the median income for a family was $37,969. Males had a median income of $27,212 versus $17,344 for females. The per capita income for the city was $15,636. About 7.9% of families and 9.9% of the population were below the poverty line, including 16.7% of those under age 18 and 5.4% of those age 65 or over.

Education
It is within the MFL MarMac Community School District. The district formed on July 1, 1994 with the merger of the Mar-Mac and M-F-L districts.

Notable people
 Samuel Merrill, Governor of Iowa from 1868 to 1872
 Leo Stanton Rowe, director general of the Pan-American Union from 1920 to 1946
 Ringling brothers, circus
 John Ward Studebaker, U.S. Commissioner of Education from 1934 to 1948
 Thomas Updegraff, United States House of Representatives from Iowa
 Andrew Clemens, sand artist
 Dorothy M. Johnson, author
 Joseph "Diamond Joe" Reynolds, steamboat entrepreneur, grain dealer, railroad builder 
 Lucy Hobbs Taylor, first woman in the world to earn a degree as Doctor of Dental Surgery
 Lucy Maynard Salmon, American historian, Vassar professor
 Marian E. Hubbard, zoologist, Wellesley professor
 Frank Lloyd Wright, American architect lived there as an infant from 1867-1869

See also
 16 to Life
 Effigy Mounds National Monument

References

External links
 McGregor-Marquette Chamber of Commerce

 
Cities in Iowa
Cities in Clayton County, Iowa
Iowa populated places on the Mississippi River
1847 establishments in Iowa